Pollanisus is a genus of moths of the family Zygaenidae. They are native to Australia and many species have metallic forewings and bodies.

Species
Pollanisus acharon (Fabricius, 1775)
Pollanisus angustifrons Tarmann, 2005
Pollanisus apicalis (Walker, 1854)
Pollanisus calliceros Turner, 1926
Pollanisus commoni Tarmann, 2005
Pollanisus contrastus Tarmann, 2005
Pollanisus cupreus Walker, 1854
Pollanisus cyanota (Meyrick, 1886)
Pollanisus edwardsi Tarmann, 2005
Pollanisus empyrea (Meyrick, 1888)
Pollanisus eumetopus Turner, 1926
Pollanisus eungellae Tarmann, 2005
Pollanisus incertus Tarmann, 2005
Pollanisus isolatus Tarmann, 2005
Pollanisus lithopastus Turner, 1926
Pollanisus marriotti Kallies & Mollet, 2011
Pollanisus modestus Tarmann, 2005
Pollanisus nielseni Tarmann, 2005
Pollanisus subdolosa (Walker, 1865)
Pollanisus trimacula (Walker, 1854)
Pollanisus viridipulverulenta (Guérin-Méneville, 1839)

References
Australian Faunal Directory
Zygaenid moths of Australia: a revision of the Australian Zygaenidae
http://search.informit.com.au/documentSummary;dn=310006559428539;res=IELHSS

 
Zygaenidae genera